Morris Township is a township in Texas County, in the U.S. state of Missouri.

Morris Township was erected in 1852, taking its name from Macajah Morris, a pioneer citizen.

References

Townships in Missouri
Townships in Texas County, Missouri